Cordery is a surname. Notable people with the surname include:

Hugh Sherwood Cordery (1880–1973), New Zealand customs official
Richard Cordery, British actor
Violette Cordery (1900–1983), British racing driver

See also
Corddry